Dato' Haji Phahrolrazi bin Haji Mohd Zawawi (born 8 September 1953) is a Malaysian politician who has served as Member of the Kedah State Legislative Assembly (MLA) for Alor Mengkudu since May 2018 and Pengkalan Kundor from March 2008 to May 2018 as well as from December 1999 to March 2004. He served as the State Leader of the Opposition of Kedah from July 2020 to October 2022 and Member of the Kedah State Executive Council (EXCO) in the Pakatan Rakyat (PR) state administration under former Menteri Besar Azizan Abdul Razak from March 2009 to February 2012. He is presently an independent and was a member of the National Trust Party (AMANAH), a component party of the Pakatan Harapan (PH) opposition coalition. He also served as State Chairman of AMANAH of Kedah from November 2019 to his removal from the party in October 2022. He was also a member of the Malaysian Islamic Party (PAS), a component party of the PR opposition coalition. He was also the State Deputy Chairman of AMANAH of Kedah and State Deputy Commissioner of PAS of Kedah.

Education
He holds a Bachelor's degree (Hons) from Universiti Teknologi Malaysia (UTM).

Career
Among his experiences after obtaining a degree from UTM are Public Works Department (JKR) Engineers, housing developers, construction contractors and consulting engineers.

Political career

Member of the Kedah State Legislative Assembly for Pengkalan Kundor (1999–2004 & 2008–2018)

In the 1999 Kedah state election, he was nominated by his party PAS to contest for the Pengkalan Kundor against Abdul Ghani Jamaludin from BN and UMNO and went on to defeat him to be elected as the new Pengkalan Kundor MLA for his first term with a majority of 697 votes.

In the 2004 Kedah state election, he was renominated by PAS to seek for reelection as Pengkalan Kundor MLA. However this time, he was defeated by another candidate from BN and UMNO Mohd Jamil Md Idross who was also the Pengkalan Kundor MLA with a minority of 3,429 votes.

In the 2008 Kedah state election, he was renominated once again by PAS to regain the Pengkalan Kundor state seat and he went on to defeat the BN and UMNO candidate again and reelected as the Pengkalan Kundor for his second term.

In the 2013 Kedah state election, he was renominated twice again by his party PAS to defend his Pengkalan Kundor state seat and proceeded to defeat opponents and win again for his third term.

Member of the Kedah State Executive Council (2009–2012) 
After winning the 2008 general election, he was appointed chairman of the Rural Development, Entrepreneurship and Careers Committee. [1] [2] He was later appointed chairman of the Housing and Local Government, Works, Water Supply, Water Resources and Energy Committee. On 12 April 2008, he was appointed a Member of the Kedah State Development Corporation (PKNK). [3]

Relations with former Menteri Besar Azizan Abdul Razak
Two of the PAS exco members - Phahrolrazi Mohd Nawawi (Pengkalan Kundor Assemblyman) and Dr Ismail Salleh (Alor Mengkudu Assemblyman) reportedly did not want to be re -appointed to the post "due to lack of confidence in Azizan's leadership." On Tuesday 28 February 2012, Azizan tried to "get a mandate from the party's top leadership to avoid a political crisis." Eight of the 10 Kedah exco members took the oath of office in front of the Chairman of the Kedah Sultan's Regents, Datuk Seri Tunku Annuar Sultan Badlishah. Two other exco members, Phahrolrazi and Datuk Dr Ismail Salleh, are said to have refused to continue their posts.

Mahfuz Omar (Pas Pokok Sena) rejected the notion that Azizan's firmness in the Universities and University Colleges Act (AUKU) towards Kolej Universiti Insaniah (KUIN) students was the cause of problems in the state. Malaysian Student Solidarity (SMM) president Ahmad Syukri Ab Razab stated that several student organizations had warned that they would hold a protest in front of Wisma Darul Aman on 19 February 2012.

Azizan is considered an old leader (72 years old) who is stubborn and difficult to discipline. PAS secretary-general Datuk Mustafa Ali directed his vice -president, Salahuddin Ayub, to Kedah as a mediator to help resolve the crisis.

Utusan Malaysia and UMNO tried to fight them but Phahrolrazi denied creating a movement against the Menteri Besar.

Pharolrazi is a leading figure in the moderate 'Erdogan' faction of PAS, named after the Turkish Prime Minister and President Recep Tayyip Erdogan. During PAS's term in state government from 2008 to 2013, he emerged as a leadership rival to the Menteri Besar (Chief Minister) Azizan Abdul Razak, of the party's conservative ulama faction. The breakdown in the relationship between Pharolrazi and Azizan led to Pharolrazi to refuse reappointment as a member of the Executive Council in 2012, before rejoining the council after a brief period. In 2014 he formed PasMa, a splinter movement of the national party formed by members of the Erdogan faction concerned that the party's conservative leadership might cause a breakdown in the Pakatan Rakyat coalition between PAS, Anwar Ibrahim's People's Justice Party and the Democratic Action Party.

Member of the Kedah State Legislative Assembly for Alor Mengkudu (since 2018)

In the 2018 Kedah state election, he contested for a different seat and in a different ticket. He was nominated by his new party AMANAH which is part of PH to contest for Alor Mengkudu state seat. He managed to claim victory again and be elected as the new Alor Mengkudu MLA for his term. PH also defeated BN in the election and formed the new administration led by Kedah PH and BERSATU Chairman as well as new Menteri Besar Mukhriz Mahathir replacing the BN administration under Ahmad Bashah Md Hanipah. However, given that he is the PH and government MLA, he was not reappointed as an EXCO member by Mukhriz.

State Chairman of the National Trust Party of Kedah (2019–2022)

On 14 November 2019 during the Kedah AMANAH Convention, he was promoted as the new State Chairman of AMANAH of Kedah replacing Ismail Salleh who in turn became his deputy. On 30 October 2022, he was sacked from AMANAH for going against the party interests, disobeying the party decisions and violating the party constitution. With this, State Deputy Chairman Ismail Salleh would take over him as the Acting State Chairman and carry out the tasks and duties of the position. In response, President of AMANAH Mohamad Sabu explained that the party had taken the decision as the actions of Phahrolrazi had potential to aggravate the situation as PH prepared for the 2022 general election (GE15) and expressed hope that Phahrolrazi could improve in future and be taken back to the party, he also stressed that it was normal to remove members with bad discipline from the party and the appeal process for the decision could proceed as well as highlighting the role of Phahrolrazi as the pioneer of the party and hard work he had done for the party. Communications Director of AMANAH Khalid Abdul Samad replied that difference of opinions was allowed in the party but inciting others not to work for election and resulting in splits and divisions within the party were not. His removal from the party was believed to be linked with his insistent request for the Malay-majority Jerai federal seat, which was allocated to another component party of PH Democratic Action Party (DAP) under PH, to be returned to AMANAH. He said the issue had become a bone of contention between Kedah AMANAH, which he previously led as State Chairman, and the AMANAH central leadership, which Mohamad led as President, as it was not meant for DAP, which would be nominating its State Deputy Chairman of Kedah Zulhazmi Shariff for the seat. Phahrolrazi further pointed out that about 80% of the voters in Jerai were Malays and they could not “accept DAP” due to its "anti-Malay" and "anti-Islam" stereotypical images and it was a must to take into account the sentiments of voters. He added that the issue had been going on for almost a month. Phahrolrazi said the Kedah AMANAH had conveyed its firm stance to the central leadership, even to the extent of wanting to pull out of GE15 if the seat was given to DAP. While acknowledging that DAP was a good ally of AMANAH, he said Jerai should not be turned into a testing ground for Malay electoral acceptance of DAP. In another response to his removal from AMANAH, he admitted that he was shocked by the action but did not regret it or feel sad about it, adding that he would not be appealing against his removal from the party.

State Leader of the Opposition of Kedah (2020–2022)
On 20 July 2020, he was appointed as the new State Leader of the Opposition of Kedah to take over Muhammad Sanusi Md Nor who was swept into power as the new Menteri Besar two months before on 17 May 2020 and after PH also returned to the opposition. On 31 October 2022 following his removal from AMANAH, the component party of PH opposition coalition, a day prior on 30 October 2022, he became an independent Kedah MLA, disqualifying him from holding the position, he was replaced with Johari Abdul, the Gurun MLA from another component party of PH, the People's Justice Party (PKR).

Election results

Honours
  :
  Knight Companion of the Order of Loyalty to the Royal House of Kedah (DSDK) - Dato' (2008)

References

Living people
Former Malaysian Islamic Party politicians
1953 births
People from Kedah
Malaysian Muslims
Malaysian people of Malay descent
National Trust Party (Malaysia) politicians
Members of the Kedah State Legislative Assembly
Kedah state executive councillors